is a former Japanese football player.

Club statistics

References

External links

1981 births
Living people
Sapporo University alumni
Association football people from Hokkaido
People from Tomakomai, Hokkaido
Japanese footballers
J2 League players
J3 League players
Japan Football League players
Hokkaido Consadole Sapporo players
Roasso Kumamoto players
Giravanz Kitakyushu players
V-Varen Nagasaki players
FC Ryukyu players
ReinMeer Aomori players
Association football defenders
Universiade gold medalists for Japan
Universiade medalists in football